Kiriko may refer to:

People
Kiriko Nananan, Japanese manga artist 
Kiriko Isono, Japanese comedian
Kiriko Takemura, Japanese tarento, singer, and model known professionally as Kyary Pamyu Pamyu

Places
 Kiriko, Kenya, a settlement in Kenya
 Kirkos, also spelled Kirikos, a district in Addis Ababa, Ethiopia
 Kiriko Museum, a museum in Wajima, Ishikawa

Other
 Kiriko (Overwatch), a video game character appearing in Overwatch 2 (2022)
 Kiriko, a 2022 short film featuring the Overwatch character
Satsuma kiriko, style of cut glass

Japanese feminine given names